Walnut Springs is a city located in Bosque County in Central Texas. The population was 827 at the 2010 census.

Geography

Walnut Springs is located at  (32.058353, –97.749190).

Demographics

2020 census

As of the 2020 United States census, there were 795 people, 254 households, and 209 families residing in the city.

2000 census
As of the census of 2000, 755 people, 262 households, and 190 families were residing in the city. The population density was 566.4 people/sq mi (219.2/km). The 312 housing units averaged 234.1/sq mi (90.6/km). The racial makeup of the city was 87.95% White, 1.32% Native American, 8.08% from other races, and 2.65% from two or more races. Hispanics or Latinos of any race were 28.08% of the population.

Of the 262 households, 35.9% had children under  18 living with them, 56.9% were married couples living together, 9.5% had a female householder with no husband present, and 27.1% were not families. About 24.4% of all households were made up of individuals, and 13.4% had someone living alone who was 65 or older. The average household size was 2.88, and the average family size was 3.46.

In the city, the age distribution was 33.0% under 18, 8.3% from 18 to 24, 25.0% from 25 to 44, 19.6% from 45 to 64, and 14.0% who were 65  or older. The median age was 33 years. For every 100 females, there were 103.5 males. For every 100 females age 18 and over, there were 95.4 males.

Males had a median income of $24,643 versus $14,875 for females. The per capita income for the city was $11,332. About 19.7% of families and 30.5% of the population were below the poverty line, including 41.7% of those under 18 and 17.2% of those 65 or over.

Education
The City of Walnut Springs is served by the Walnut Springs Independent School District. The city features a single high school, Walnut Springs High School.

Gallery

References

Cities in Bosque County, Texas
Cities in Texas